Peter Alexander Tomory (3 January 1922 – 25 March 2008) was a British art historian, museum curator and director.

Biography
Tomory was born in Hong Kong and educated in India and the UK. In 1940 he joined the Royal Navy and served for five and a half years, including patrols on the Murmansk run. After the War he undertook postgraduate study at University of Edinburgh.

In 1950 he was appointed Assistant Curator of York Art Gallery under Hans Hess. In 1951 he curated the gallery's contribution to the 1951 Festival of Britain, titled "Masterpieces from Yorkshire Houses". He was appointed director of the Auckland City Art Gallery, where he worked from 1956–65; an archive of his research, lecture notes and diaries from his time there is retained by the museum.

Tomory worked with Colin McCahon in the gallery to promote the institutional focus of the gallery towards historical and contemporary New Zealand art. He also founded a research journal in the gallery, the Gallery Quarterly. The Auckland Art Gallery acquired 124 prints from Tomory's private collection in 2004.

He left the art gallery in 1964 to take up a post in the newly formed Art History department of the University of Auckland. He left that post to teach at Columbia University and Hunter College. He also worked as the Senior Curator of Baroque Art at  the John and Mable Ringling Museum of Art.

In 1972 he was appointed Professor of the History of Art at La Trobe University where he worked for fifteen years. He was appointed a Fellow of the Australian Academy of the Humanities in 1974 and served on its council from 1984 to 1986. He was also a founding member of the Art Association of Australia.

In 1987 he retired and returned to the UK.

Select publications
1979. (with J H Füssli). The poetical circle: Fuseli and the British 
1989. (with Robert Gaston) European paintings before 1800: in Australian and New Zealand public collections
1997. (with Anne Kirker). British Painting 1800–1990 in Australian and New Zealand Collections. Sydney, Beagle Press.

References

British art curators
1922 births
2008 deaths
Employees of York Art Gallery
Fellows of the Australian Academy of the Humanities
Academic staff of La Trobe University
Columbia University faculty
Hunter College faculty
Academic staff of the University of Auckland
British expatriates in Hong Kong
British people in colonial India
British expatriates in New Zealand
British expatriates in the United States
British expatriates in Australia